Peng Shuai and Yan Zi were the defending champions. They were both present but did not compete together.
Peng partnered with Yanina Wickmayer, but lost in the first round to Mariya Koryttseva and Tatiana Poutchek.
Yan partnered with Sun Tiantian, but Mariya Koryttseva and Tatiana Poutchek defeated them 6–3, 4–6, [10–8] in the final.

Seeds

  Sun Tiantian /  Yan Zi (final)
  Mariya Koryttseva /  Tatiana Poutchek (champions)
  Jill Craybas /  Olga Govortsova (quarterfinals)
  Akgul Amanmuradova /  Anastasia Rodionova (semifinals, withdrew)

Draw

Draw

External links 
 Draw

2008 Doubles
Guangzhou International Women's Open